Max M. Vekich (born 1954 or 1955) is an American politician and labor leader who serves as a commissioner of the Federal Maritime Commission. A member of the Democratic Party, Vekich previously served as a member of the Washington House of Representatives from 1983 to 1991.

Early life and education 
Vekich was born and raised in Aberdeen, Washington. He earned an associate degree from Grays Harbor College and a Bachelor of Arts degree in political science and history from the University of Puget Sound.

Career 
Vekich has previously worked as a longshoreman and labor leader. He was also a member of the Pacific Maritime Association. He served as a member of the Washington House of Representatives from 1983 to 1991 as a Democrat. In 2009, Vekich was an unsuccessful candidate for a seat on the Seattle Port Commission.

Federal Maritime Commission
On June 23, 2021, President Joe Biden nominated Vekich to serve as a commissioner of the Federal Maritime Commission. Hearings were held before the Senate Commerce Committee on October 20, 2021. The committee favorably reported the nomination to the Senate floor on November 17, 2021. Vekich's nomination expired at the end of the year and was returned to President Biden on January 3, 2022.

President Biden resent his nomination the following day. The committee favorably reported the nomination on February 2, 2022. Vekich was confirmed by the United States Senate on February 10, 2022.

Vekich was sworn into office on February 15, 2022.

Personal life 
Vekich lives in West Seattle with his wife, Marcee Stone. He has three adult children from a previous marriage.

References 

Living people
People from Aberdeen, Washington
University of Puget Sound alumni
Democratic Party members of the Washington House of Representatives
Federal Maritime Commission members
Year of birth missing (living people)
Biden administration personnel